Henry Giessenbier (1892–1935) was an American banker in St. Louis, Missouri of German ancestry. He became the founder of the Young Men's Progressive Civic Association in 1915 and the United States Junior Chamber in 1920.

HISTORY

20th-century American businesspeople
American people of German descent
American bankers
American founders
Businesspeople from Missouri
Junior Chamber International
Businesspeople from St. Louis
1892 births
1935 deaths